Patrick Lin may refer to:

 Patrick Lin (chef)
 Patrick Lin (cinematographer)

See also
Patrick Lynn (born 1965), American professional bodybuilder